The 1996 All-Ireland Senior Camogie Championship Final was the 65th All-Ireland Final and the deciding match of the 1996 All-Ireland Senior Camogie Championship, an inter-county camogie tournament for the top teams in Ireland.

Cork led 1-9 to 1-6 at half-time, but went on to rue missed chances. Denise Gilligan scored two goals for Galway.

References

All-Ireland Senior Camogie Championship Finals
|All-Ireland Senior Camogie Championship Final
All-Ireland Senior Camogie Championship Final
All-Ireland Senior Camogie Championship Final, 1996